The Agusan Hydroelectric Plant, the downstream facility of two proposed plants, was constructed in Damilag, Manolo Fortich, Bukidnon to serve the immediate domestic and industrial requirements of the area. The watershed is small, and covers an area of around 25 km2 at the diversion dam. The run-of-river plant consists of two 800-kW turbine generators that use water from the Agusan River to generate electricity. It is connected to the local distribution grid Cepalco through the Transco distribution line.

References

Dams in the Philippines
Hydroelectric power plants in the Philippines